U.S. Route 60 and U.S. Route 62 (US 60/US 62) run for a very short distance within the state of Illinois. The highways run concurrently for their entire existence within the state. The joint highway runs around Fort Defiance in Cairo, from the Cairo Mississippi River Bridge over the Mississippi River east to the Cairo Ohio River Bridge over the Ohio River; the Ohio River Bridge also carries US 51. The bridges cross the two rivers just north of the mouth of the Ohio.

Route description

US 60/US 62 enters Illinois via the Cairo Mississippi River Bridge, a narrow, through truss bridge. The bridge deposits the highway onto a viaduct which rises above farmland in the alluvial plain. At the northern end of the causeway is the entrance to Fort Defiance Park, a former Civil War military post and later state park. Fort Defiance marks the confluence of the Mississippi and Ohio Rivers and Illinois' southernmost and lowest points. The lone intersection for US 60/US 62 is with US 51, which joins from the north. The three highway designations come together to head northeast and rise onto the Cairo Ohio River Bridge and into Kentucky.

The Great River Road's National Route overlaps US 60/US 62 from the intersection with US 51 to the Kentucky state line.

History

Until the Mississippi River Bridge opened , US 60 used a ferry directly from Bird's Point, Missouri, across that river (below the Ohio) to Wickliffe, Kentucky. After that it ran into Cairo and used a ferry from roughly 22nd Street to East Cairo, Kentucky. US 62 was designated around 1930, and the Ohio River Bridge replaced the ferry in 1937.

Originally, the Mississippi River bridge opened in 1929. It was a boon to economies of Southeast Missouri and Northern Arkansas. The toll drivers would have had to pay on the Mississippi bridge was $1.40.

Meanwhile, the Ohio River bridge was delayed. An Act of Congress gave them more time. It was eventually dedicated on November 11, 1938, and made toll free exactly ten years later. It had a cost of $3 million (equivalent to $ in ).

Major intersections

References

External links

Visitors Guide to the Fort Defiance Park at Greatriverroad.com

 Illinois
060
U.S. Route 60
Cairo, Illinois